Faisal bin Abdul Rahman Al Saud ( Fayṣal bin 'Abd ar Raḥman Āl Su'ūd) is a Saudi prince who was the 8th president of Al-Nassr Club. He was the head of Al-Nassr from 1997 to 2000, where he led the club to the FIFA Club World Cup in Brazil, and from 2006 onward.

He is a grandson of King Saud and the son of Prince Abdul Rahman bin Saud Al Saud, the godfather of Al-Nassr Club. In addition, he is the nephew of Prince Sultan bin Saud, the 6th President of Al-Nassr, and the half-brother of Mamdouh bin Abdul Rahman bin Saud, the 10th President of the club.

References

Faisal
Faisal
Al Nassr FC
Faisal
Living people
Faisal
Sports owners
Year of birth missing (living people)